Gerald Eastmure (born 20 February 1935) is a former Australian rules footballer who played with North Melbourne in the Victorian Football League (VFL).

Eastmure, a rover, played with North Melbourne for eight seasons, after making his way up from the fourths. He represented Victoria in 1957, 1959 and 1960. 

In 1962 he left North Melbourne and joined Leeton, as captain-coach in the South West Football League (New South Wales).

References

1935 births
Australian rules footballers from Victoria (Australia)
North Melbourne Football Club players
Living people